Jon Santaanta Proudstar (born January 3, 1967, in Tucson, Arizona) is an American film actor, film & comic book writer, and director.

He first appeared in Madhouse with John Larroquette and Kirstie Alley in 1990.

Proudstar wrote the one-shot comic book Tribal Force, illustrated by Ryan Huna Smith, and published in 1996.

Proudstar attended the 1998 Sundance Writers Lab as well as the Sundance Director's Lab in 2005.

Proudstar wrote, directed, and starred in his first independent film, Dude Vision, in 2005. Dude Vision won Best Comedy at the 2005 Arizona International Film Festival and Best Short Subject at the 2005 Native Voice Film Festival.

In 2009, Proudstar released his first feature film, So Close to Perfect.

In 2013, Proudstar contributed a story (illustrated by Terry LaBan) to the Graphic Classics volume Native American Classics.

Personal life 
Proudstar's heritage includes Yaqui, Mayan, Jewish, and Latino ancestors.

Selected filmography 
 Reservation Dogs (2021)
 Jackrabbit Sky (2007)
 Four Sheets to the Wind (2007)
 Into The West (2006)
 Dude Vision (2005)
 Border Warz (2004)
 Auf Wiedersehen, Pet (2002)
 Walker, Texas Ranger (1998)
 Bodies, Rest & Motion (1993)
 Madhouse (1990)

References

External links 
 
 Dude Vision on IMDB

American male actors
Living people
Native American filmmakers
1967 births
People from Tucson, Arizona
Native American actors